Wang Qing is the name of:

Wang Qing (Water Margin), fictional Song dynasty rebel leader from the Chinese novel Water Margin
Qing Wang (academic), Chinese-born British professor at Warwick Business School
Wang Qing (actor) (born 1993), Chinese actor, singer and host

See also
Wangqing County, Jilin, China